Erika Glässner (28 February 1890 – 21 July 1959) was a German stage and film actress.

Selected filmography
 Werner Krafft (1916)
 Diamonds (1920)
 The Three Dances of Mary Wilford (1920)
 The Love Corridor (1921)
 The Story of a Maid (1921)
 The Sins of the Mother (1921)
 The Hunt for the Truth (1921)
 Your Valet (1922)
 The Countess of Paris (1923)
 The Flower Girl of Potsdam Square (1925)
 The Marriage Swindler (1925)
 People to Each Other (1926)
 Kubinke the Barber (1926)
 Break-in (1927)
 Family Gathering in the House of Prellstein (1927)
 Children of the Street (1929)
 The Love Hotel (1933)
 Greetings and Kisses, Veronika (1933)
 Madame Wants No Children (1933)
 Paganini (1934)
 Heinz in the Moon (1934)
 Pygmalion (1935)
 Punks Arrives from America (1935)
 The Unsuspecting Angel (1936)
 Women for Golden Hill (1938)
 Left of the Isar, Right of the Spree (1940)
 Why Are You Lying, Elisabeth? (1944)
 Corinna Schmidt (1951)
 Karriere in Paris (1952)

Bibliography

External links

1890 births
1959 suicides
German stage actresses
German film actresses
German silent film actresses
20th-century German actresses
Actors from Erfurt
Suicides in Germany